"The Clairvoyant" is a song by the English heavy metal band Iron Maiden. It is the band's nineteenth single and the third from their seventh studio album, Seventh Son of a Seventh Son (1988). The single, which was also released as a clear vinyl, peaked at number six in the British charts. It contains three live performances from Maiden's 1988 headlining performance at the Monsters of Rock festival in Donington Park.

The promotional video for the song, although set to the studio version, features live clips from the Donington performance.

Song information
The song starts in the first person, from the main character's point of view. Later, when he is dead it is in the third person. According to Steve Harris, the song was inspired by the death of psychic Doris Stokes, and his wondering that if she were truly able to see the future, would not she had foreseen her own death?

The song's guitar solo is played by Dave Murray.

Track listing 
7" Single

12" Single

Personnel
Production credits are adapted from the 12 inch vinyl cover.
Iron Maiden
Bruce Dickinson – lead vocals
Dave Murray – guitar
Adrian Smith – guitar, backing vocals
Steve Harris – bass guitar, backing vocals
Nicko McBrain – drums
Additional musicians
 Michael Kenney – keyboards
Production
Martin Birch – producer
Tony Wilson – producer
Derek Riggs – cover illustration
Ross Halfin – photography

Versions

Chart performance

Notes

References

Iron Maiden songs
1988 singles
Songs written by Steve Harris (musician)
1988 songs
EMI Records singles